Japanese football in 1955.

Emperor's Cup

National team

Results

Players statistics

Births
February 14 - Mitsuhisa Taguchi
April 5 - Takayoshi Yamano
April 7 - Akira Nishino
April 8 - Kazuyoshi Nakamura
April 27 - Katsuyuki Kawachi
November 2 - Koji Tanaka
November 20 - Toshio Matsuura

External links

 
Seasons in Japanese football